The Muslim Chhipi is Muslim community found mainly in the states of Bihar, Madhya Pradesh, Uttar Pradesh and Uttarakhand in India.

Origin

According to their traditions, the Chhipi, or sometimes pronounced Chhipa were originally Rajputs who were imprisoned by Taimur at the fort of Lohargarh in Rajasthan. They escaped from the fort and fled to Rohilkhand.  The Rajputs then hid, and were known as the chhipna Rajputs after the Hindi word for hidden which is chhipana. Over time chhipna was corrupted to chhipi. Most traditions rather state that they get their name from the Hindi word chhapna, which means to print. Other traditions refer to their taking up the occupation of printing clothes after the conversion of the community to Islam. The Chhipi is generally considered simply as an endogamous sub-group within the Rangrez community.

See also

 Muslims of Uttar Pradesh

References

Social groups of Uttar Pradesh
Muslim communities of Uttar Pradesh
Muslim communities of India